Maria Elisabeth "Lisa" Ekedahl (16 July 1895 Växjö - 18 January 1980 Danderyd) was a Swedish lawyer and campaigner for women's suffrage. She was one of the first women in Sweden who worked with law. Lisa Ekedahl started as a secretary at Eva Andén's law firm around 1920, but she had not been allowed by her family to take the studentexamen, so she never received a law degree. Nevertheless, she worked with law at Eva Andén's law firm throughout her professional life.

References

Further reading 
 

1895 births
1980 deaths
20th-century Swedish lawyers
20th-century women lawyers
Swedish suffragists
20th-century Swedish women